Lop, United States National Geospatial-Intelligence Agency County, also Luopu (from Mandarin Chinese), is a county in Hotan Prefecture, in the southwest of the Xinjiang Uyghur Autonomous Region, China. Almost all the residents of the county are Uyghur and live around oases situated between the desolate Taklamakan Desert and Kunlun Mountains. The county is bordered to the north by Aksu and Awat County in Aksu Prefecture, to the east by Qira/Chira County, to the northwest by Karakax County, to the west by Hotan (Khotan) and to the south and west by Hotan County.

History
Local inhabitants at Sampul cemetery (Shanpula;  / ) around  where art such as the Sampul tapestry has been found, buried their dead from roughly 217 BCE to 283 CE. The analysis of mtDNA haplogroup distribution showed that the Sampula inhabitants had a large mixture of East Asian, West-Asian and European characteristics. According to Chengzhi et al. (2007), analysis of maternal mitochondrial DNA of the human remains has revealed genetic affinities at the maternal side to Ossetians and Iranians, an Eastern-Mediterranean paternal lineage.

Archaeologist Aurel Stein visited Rawak Stupa during his First Central Asian expedition in April 1901.

Lop County was established in August 1902.

In May 1956, Abdimit, a Sufi shaykh from Khotan, attempted to incite insurrection in the county which was put down by armed troops and police forces.

The Sampul tapestry was discovered in Sampul in the mid-1980s.

Between August 1986 and May 1987, an outbreak of viral hepatitis occurred in Dol (Duolu) township resulting in 9,371 cases of acute hepatitis and 47 deaths.

In 2004, an official who declined to be identified from the Lop county religious affairs committee told Radio Free Asia that fasting was not allowed during Ramadan, and that high school students in his town would be given candy before they left school at 4:30 p.m.. The official confirmed reports that Chinese authorities were continuing a program of heavy religious control and censorship.

On July 11, 2006, the townships of Jiya and Yurungqash (Yulongkashi), then part of Lop County, were transferred to Hotan City.

According to the World Uyghur Congress, in the lead-up to the 2008 Beijing Olympics, authorities in Lop county forced women to remove head coverings in a stated effort to promote "women for the new era".

On October 21, 2014, Sampul township was re-designated as a town.

At 9 PM on May 11 and 8:15 AM on May 12, 2015, two suicide bombings at a security checkpoint station in the county resulted in six deaths and four injured.

On November 20, 2016, Hanggiya (Hanggui) was changed from a township into a town.

Marriages between Uyghurs and Han Chinese persons are encouraged with subsidies by the government. In October 2017, the marriage of a Han Chinese man from Henan Province to a Uyghur woman from the county was celebrated on the county's social media page.

Hetian Haolin Hair Accessories, a company first registered at the Lop County Beijing Industrial Park in 2018, employed 5,000 new workers in its first year of business, making 159 international shipments. The Lop County Beijing Industrial Park has been associated with re-education camp photographs.

According to The Guardian, as of early 2019, there were eight internment camps, officially labelled "vocational training centres", in the county.

To increase aid delivery to Xinjiang, places in Xinjiang are paired with other areas of China which can provide aid. Tianjin and Hotan are paired in this program. In July 2019, football equipment and training materials with pictures and videos to local youth players and football coaches were provided for primary school students in the county.

On September 14, 2020, the U.S. Department of Homeland Security blocked imports of products from four entities in Xinjiang including all products made with labor from the Lop County No. 4 Vocational Skills Education and Training Center and hair products made in the Lop County Hair Product Industrial Park.

Geography

The northern part of Lop County is made up of sand dunes and ends in a straight line drawn in the Taklamakan Desert that forms part of the boundary between Hotan Prefecture and Aksu Prefecture. The Hotan River forms the boundary with Karakax County. The National Closed Sandified Land Protected Area is located in Northern Hanggiya Township.

The towns and townships are clustered around the oases around the highways in the southern part of the county.

The southern tip of the county reaches the Kunlun Mountains.

Climate

Administrative divisions
The county includes one subdistrict, three towns, six townships, and three other areas:

Subdistrict:
 Chengqu Subdistrict

Towns:
 Lop (Luopu;  / ), Sampul (Shanpulu;  / , formerly ), Hanggiya (Hanggui;  / , formerly )

Townships:
 Buya ( / ), Charbagh (Qia'erbage;  / ), Dol (Duolu;  / ), Nawa ( / ), Beshtoghraq (Baishi Tuogelake;  / ), Aqqik (Aqike, Achchiq;  / )

Others:
 Seed Farm, Lop County Beijing Agricultural Science and Technology Demonstration Park, Lop County Beijing Industrial Park

Economy
The county is known for its silk and carpets. The county's economy is primarily agricultural, producing cotton, wheat, corn and silkworm cocoons. Industries in the county include tractor repair, concrete, carpets, and silk reeling.

, there was about 44,300 acres (293,944 mu) of cultivated land in Lop.

Demographics

According to the 2002 census, it had a population of 240,000.

At the end of 2008, 98% of the population of Lop County was Uyghur and 1.9% of the population was Han Chinese.

As of 2015, 282,513 of the 287,590 residents of the county were Uyghur, 4,895 were Han Chinese and 182 were from other ethnic groups.

As of the 2010s, the population of the county, reported as 280,000 by The Guardian, was almost entirely Uyghur.

As of 1999, 98.6% of the population of Lop (Luopu) County was Uyghur and 1.36% of the population was Han Chinese.

In 1952, the population of Lop was 123,608.

Transportation
 China National Highway 217 through the Taklamakan Desert to northern Xinjiang
 China National Highway 315 between Hotan and Qira County
 G3012 Turpan–Hotan Expressway

Notes

References

County-level divisions of Xinjiang
Hotan Prefecture